Cristina Elena Grigoraş (born 11 February 1966) is a retired Romanian artistic gymnast. She is a two-time Olympic medalist with the team (gold in 1984 and silver in 1980). Individually, she won four medals (vault, all-around, uneven bars and floor) at the 1981 European Championships. She is best known for a skill on the balance beam named after her: forward salto tucked with ½ twist (180°) take off from both legs.

Gymnastics career
Grigoraş trained at CSS Cetate Deva with Márta and Béla Károlyi until their defection to United States in 1981 and with coaches Adrian Goreac, Adrian Stan, Maria Cosma and Octavian Belu after 1981.

1980 and the Olympic Games
Her senior debut in an international event was at the 1980 Italian-Romanian meet where she placed first with the team and second all-around. Her participation at the 1980 World Cup in Toronto brought her a bronze medal on vault. She also placed fourth all around ahead of teammate Emilia Eberle, fifth on floor and eight on balance beam. Together with Nadia Comăneci, Rodica Dunca, Emilia Eberle, Melita Ruhn and Dumitriţa Turner, Grigoraş was a member of the silver medal team at the 1980 Olympics. At these Olympic games she did not compete in any individual final event.

1981
At the 1981 European Championships in Madrid, Spain, Grigoraş medaled in all events except the balance beam. She won silver in the all around behind Maxi Gnauck, gold on vault, silver on uneven bars, bronze on floor and she placed eighth on beam. Her results in the all around and the events finals were the highest among her team members. In 1981 she also won the Champions All Trophy and was a team member at the 1981 World Championships in Moscow. At these World Championships she placed fourth with the team and fifth in the all around and uneven bars events. Once again her result in the all around was the highest among the Romanian team.

1982–1984 and the Olympic Games
In 1982 Grigoraş did not compete at all. She returned to gymnastics events in 1983, but she was only an alternate in the team at the 1983 World Championships. In 1984 she won several medals for all around at some minor international events. In 1984 Grigoraş went with the team to Los Angeles to compete at the 1984 Olympic Games. The other members of the team were Lavinia Agache, Laura Cutina, Simona Păucă, Mihaela Stănuleţ, and Ecaterina Szabo. She contributed to the team gold medal and she placed eighth in the preliminaries of the all around event.

Eponymous skill
Grigoraş has one eponymous skill listed in the Code of Points.

Retirement
Grigoraş' last event appears to be the 1985 Dutch Romanian meet.

References

External links 
 
 
 

1966 births
Living people
Romanian female artistic gymnasts
Gymnasts at the 1980 Summer Olympics
Gymnasts at the 1984 Summer Olympics
Olympic gymnasts of Romania
Olympic silver medalists for Romania
Olympic gold medalists for Romania
Olympic medalists in gymnastics
Medalists at the 1980 Summer Olympics
Medalists at the 1984 Summer Olympics
European champions in gymnastics
Originators of elements in artistic gymnastics
Sportspeople from Satu Mare
Romanian expatriates in Greece